The American Golf Classic was a tournament on the PGA Tour from 1961 to 1976 at Firestone Country Club in Akron, Ohio.  It was the third event at the storied South course, after the Rubber City Open Invitational (1954–1959) and the PGA Championship in 1960.

The final edition in 1976 was played on the North course, with the World Series of Golf held the following week on the South course. The World Series of Golf was succeeded by the current WGC-Bridgestone Invitational, held on the South course.

Tournament highlights
1961: Jay Hebert wins the inaugural version of the tournament by defeating Gary Player on the second hole of a sudden death playoff. To get in the playoff, Hebert had to make a 20-foot birdie putt on the 72nd hole.
1963: Johnny Pott leads the second AGC wire to wire. He wins by four shots over Arnold Palmer.
1964: Ken Venturi makes the AGC his third triumph for 1964. He finishes five shots ahead of Mason Rudolph.
1965: Al Geiberger wins for the 3rd time ever on the PGA Tour. He finishes four shots ahead of Arnold Palmer. One year later, Geiberger would also win the PGA Championship at the Firestone Country Club.
1967: Arnold Palmer becomes the first and only multiple winner of the AGC. He finishes three shots ahead of Doug Sanders.
1968: Jack Nicklaus wins in a sudden death playoff over Lee Elder and Frank Beard. Elder, a tour rookie at the time, matched Nicklaus shot for shot for four extra holes before losing on the fifth. The finish of the 1968 American Golf Classic has been called one of the most exciting in televised golf history.
1969: Raymond Floyd shoots a final round 65 to win by four shots over Bobby Nichols.
1973: Bruce Crampton wins by three shots over Lanny Wadkins, Gay Brewer, and Bob Murphy. It is Crampton's 4th win of the year and at the time vaults him to #1 on the money list for the year.
1974: Jim Colbert wins the AGC in a four-way playoff. He defeats Raymond Floyd, Gay Brewer, and Forrest Fezler.
1976: David Graham wins the last edition of the tournament, the only one played on the North course. He finished four shots ahead of Lou Graham.

Winners

References

External links
Tournament results (1970-1976) at GolfObserver.com

Former PGA Tour events
Golf in Ohio
Sports in Akron, Ohio
Recurring sporting events established in 1961
Recurring sporting events disestablished in 1976
1961 establishments in Ohio
1976 disestablishments in Ohio